Choi Ye-seul (born 24 December 1998) is a South Korean footballer who plays as a midfielder for WK League club Changnyeong WFC. She has been a member of the South Korea women's national team.

References

1998 births
Living people
South Korean women's footballers
South Korean expatriate footballers
Women's association football midfielders
South Korea women's under-20 international footballers
South Korea women's international footballers
WK League players
INAC Kobe Leonessa players
Incheon Hyundai Steel Red Angels WFC players
Expatriate women's footballers in Japan
South Korean expatriate sportspeople in Japan